"Death Has a Shadow" is the pilot episode of the American animated television series Family Guy. Written by series creator Seth MacFarlane and directed by Peter Shin, a rough-cut version of this episode originally aired on December 20, 1998, on the Fox network in the United States; a final version was later aired as a sneak peek of the show on January 31, 1999, following Super Bowl XXXIII. In the episode, Peter loses his job after drinking too much at a stag party, causing him to fall asleep at work. He signs up for welfare to keep his wife Lois from finding out but gets much more money than he expected. After spending his money foolishly, Lois finds out and Peter decides to dump it from a blimp at the Super Bowl. He is arrested for welfare fraud and must await his family's rescue, as well as various performers who would later serve as frequent recurring and guest voices on the series.

It was the first overall episode to be animated by Film Roman, Inc. and Sunwoo Digital International, through its animation division Grimsaem Animation Co.

The basis for "Death Has a Shadow", as well as Family Guy as a whole, was MacFarlane's thesis film The Life of Larry, created in 1995 while he was a student at the Rhode Island School of Design. A sequel was conceived in 1996 called Larry & Steve, which aired in 1997 as a segment of Cartoon Network's World Premiere Toons. Both shorts caught the attention of Fox, who contacted MacFarlane in 1998 to develop a series based on the films. A hand-drawn pilot was created by MacFarlane with a budget of $50,000, which led to the series being accepted for production and the pilot being remade and extended into its broadcast form.

Critical responses to the episode were mostly positive. According to Nielsen ratings, it was viewed by 22 million viewers during its original airing in the United States. In the tenth season episode "Back to the Pilot", which premiered on November 13, 2011, Brian and Stewie go back in time to the events of this episode.

Plot
As Lois prepares dinner, Stewie puts the final touches on his mind-control device, only for it to be taken away from him by Lois, who won't allow 'toys' at the table. Later, Peter asks Lois for permission to attend an upcoming stag party. After he promises he won't drink, Lois lets him go. Unfortunately, Peter forgets his promise to Lois and plays such drinking games as "Drink the beer". He goes to work the next day with a hangover and falls asleep on the job as a safety inspector in a toy factory. Peter misses dangerous objects such as a butcher knife, a surge protector, a gasoline can, razor blades, a porcupine, a toaster with forks inside, and plug-in water. The company receives bad press after releasing unsafe toy products, and Peter is promptly fired by Mr. Weed.

At dinner, Peter breaks the news to his children but decides to keep it from Lois. He tries different jobs, such as cereal mascot and sneeze guard, but fails miserably. Brian pressures him to tell her the truth, but all he manages to do is to tell Lois how fat she is. Brian insists that Peter must look out for his family's welfare. With the word "welfare" in his mind, Peter soon applies for government assistance at a welfare office. But a processing error creates a weekly check for $150,000, which is based on a remark former President Ronald Reagan made of a woman called Linda Taylor from Chicago, Illinois, calling her a "welfare queen" by making assumptions of earning such proportions from government benefits in 1974. Telling Lois he received a big raise, Peter spends his money on many foolish and extravagant things, such as renting the Statue of David, treating Meg to cosmetic surgery and even going so far as to surround his house with a moat to protect them from the Black Knight.

Unfortunately, Lois is given the welfare check by the mail lady and storms at Peter for lying to her. Peter decides to return the money to the taxpayers by dumping it from a blimp during Super Bowl XXXIII while Brian accompanies him. After the commotion they cause, they are immediately shot down.

Eventually, Lois receives the bad news and goes to court, still angry at Peter for lying to her in the first place. After Peter apologizes for lying to Lois and accepting the money instead of reporting the welfare error, the judge sentences him to 24 months in prison for welfare fraud. Lois, Brian, Chris, and Meg exclaim, "Oh no!" but the Kool-Aid Man bursts through the courthouse wall and exclaims, "Oh yeah!" Lois tries to explain he's not that bad and she loves him and insists that, no matter what, she will always stand by her husband. The judge agrees and sends her to jail with him. Stewie, being a baby, must have his parents by his side, regardless of his burning hatred for them, especially Lois. He then whips out his mind control device and forces the judge into letting his father go free and get his job back.

Peter states that he has learned his lesson and will never do it again. Instead, he is going to try for such things as a minority scholarship, a sexual harassment suit, and a disability claim.

Background

MacFarlane initially conceived Family Guy in 1995 while studying animation under the Rhode Island School of Design (RISD). During college, he created his thesis film entitled The Life of Larry, which was later submitted by his professor at RISD to Hanna-Barbera, which led to MacFarlane being hired by the company. In 1996, MacFarlane created a sequel to The Life of Larry entitled Larry and Steve, which featured a middle-aged character named Larry and an intellectual dog, Steve. The short was broadcast in 1997 as one of Cartoon Network's World Premiere Toons.

In 1997, while writing for Carol, MacFarlane planned to develop the Larry shorts into a short film series for Mad TV; however, the project was abandoned because the show did not possess a large enough budget to make any kind of animation. As development continued, the genre gradually shifted to a prime-time series, while the characters of Larry and Steve formed the basis for Peter and Brian, respectively. During the year, a Hanna-Barbera development executive introduced MacFarlane to alternative comedians Mike Darnell and Leslie Collins in an attempt to get Hanna-Barbera back into the prime-time business. The executives were unimpressed; a year later, MacFarlane contacted Collins at Fox; she arranged a meeting with him and the company executives to create a series based on the characters entitled Family Guy.

Fox proposed MacFarlane complete a 15-minute short, and gave him a budget of $50,000. After the pilot aired, the series was greenlighted. Premises were drawn from several 1980s Saturday-morning cartoons MacFarlane had watched as a child, such as The Fonz and the Happy Days Gang and Rubik, the Amazing Cube.

Production

Production of the pilot for Family Guy began in 1998, and took six months. Recalling the experience in an interview with The New York Times, MacFarlane stated,

Upon completion of the pilot, the series went on the air. "Death Has a Shadow" was the first episode of Family Guy to be aired. It was written by creator MacFarlane and was the first episode to be directed by Peter Shin. The episode guest-starred Lori Alan as Diane Simmons, Carlos Alazraqui as Mr. Weed, Mike Henry as Cleveland Brown, Billy West, Fred Tatasciore, Joey Slotnick, Phil LaMarr, Wally Wingert, and fellow cartoonist Butch Hartman as various characters. The episode aired after Super Bowl XXXIII on January 31, 1999.

For "Death Has a Shadow", several changes were made from the original pilot pitch. For the series, Lois was a redhead, as opposed to the original pilot, where she was a blonde. In the original pilot, Lois discovered that Peter lost his job, and by the end of the episode, he fails to get a new one nor does he apply for welfare. The idea for Peter to apply for welfare and unintentionally become wealthy was suggested by executive producer David Zuckerman, who suggested the idea in order to add a larger amount of plot to the episode. Several sequences and gags were integrated into the episode from creator MacFarlane's 1995 thesis film The Life of Larry, including the sequence where the Griffin family sees Philadelphia, and a brief cutaway where Peter farts for the first time at the age of 30.
 
MacFarlane was cast as four of the show's main characters: Peter Griffin, Brian Griffin, Stewie Griffin, and Glenn Quagmire. MacFarlane chose to voice these characters himself, believing it would be easier to portray the voices he already envisioned than for someone else to attempt it. MacFarlane drew inspiration for the voice of Peter from a security guard he overheard talking while attending the Rhode Island School of Design. Stewie's voice was based on the voice of English actor Rex Harrison, especially his performance in the 1964 musical My Fair Lady. MacFarlane uses his regular speaking voice when playing Brian. The voice of Quagmire was inspired by fast-speaking radio advertising spokesmen from the 1950s. MacFarlane also provides voices for various other recurring and one-time characters, including news anchor Tom Tucker and Lois' father Carter Pewterschmidt.

Alex Borstein was cast as Lois Griffin, Tricia Takanawa, Loretta Brown, and Lois' mother Barbara Pewterschmidt. Borstein was asked to provide a voice for the original pilot while she was working on MADtv. She had not met MacFarlane or seen any of his artwork and said it was "really sight unseen". At the time, Borstein performed in a stage show in Los Angeles, in which she played a redheaded mother whose voice she had based on one of her cousins. The voice was originally slower, but when MacFarlane heard it, he replied "Make it a little less  annoying...and speed it up, or every episode will last four hours". Seth Green was chosen to play Chris Griffin and Neil Goldman. Green stated that he did an impression of the "Buffalo Bill" character from the thriller film The Silence of the Lambs during his audition. His main inspiration for Chris' voice came from envisioning how "Buffalo Bill" would sound if he were speaking through a public address system at a McDonald's. Lacey Chabert was cast as Meg Griffin. Chabert voiced Meg Griffin for the first production season (15 episodes), but due to a contractual agreement was never credited. Chabert left the series because of time conflicts with schoolwork and her role on Party of Five, and was replaced by Mila Kunis.

Cultural references
In the final scenes of the episode, the Griffin family is seen watching a television program called TV's Bloopers, a reference to the 1984 ABC and NBC television series TV's Bloopers and Practical Jokes.

Towards the end of the courtroom scene, the Kool-Aid Man is seen breaking through a wall, which later became a running gag in the series involving a certain character or breaking through a wall and Peter's job as a Mascot is a parody of the Cocoa Puffs commercial.

During Peter's recount of his job search to Brian, the talent show flashback mirrors the setting from The Sound of Music and refers to the characters of the film, the von Trapp family.

Reception 

The episode has received mostly positive reviews from television critics. In a 2008 review, Ahsan Haque of IGN rated the episode an 8.9/10, praising the integration of humor into the episode's storyline. Haque noted that the episode was "a very strong start to this long running classic series, and revisiting it serves as a reminder that unlike many other television shows, there are very few awkward moments, and much of the show's brilliance is immediately apparent." In 2009, the site singled out "Death Has a Shadow" as a "strong start [to Family Guy]".

Robin Pierson of The TV Critic gave the episode a mixed review, rating the episode a 67/100, calling it one of the most densely packed pilots on television. He mentioned that it was entertaining but said that there were many jokes that followed the quality-does-not-win-out-over-quantity saying. He compared Peter to Homer Simpson and he compared the show to The Simpsons and King of the Hill. He criticized the amount of unfunny jokes while he praised the surreal moments. At the end of his review he stated that Family Guy was a different kind of animated comedy which set out to do jokes that other cartoons couldn't do, also mentioning that the show had promised to become really funny.

A more negative review came from Entertainment Weekly's Ken Tucker, who called the animation clunky, which he said made Hanna-Barbera's animation look state-of-the-art. Tucker also said in his review that he hoped that smart people would use the Family Guy half-hour to turn off the television set and start a debate over the air strikes in Kosovo. He also called the show "The Simpsons as conceived by a singularly sophomoric mind that lacks any reference point beyond other TV shows". Even before it aired the pilot had received some criticism from the Parents Television Council, a watchdog; the creator of this website L. Brent Bozell III wrote that he initially speculated that Family Guy would be "pushing the envelope".
The episode was watched by 22.01 million people after the Super Bowl.

Notes

External links

 

American television series premieres
Family Guy (season 1) episodes
1999 American television episodes
Television episodes about termination of employment
Super Bowl lead-out shows
Super Bowl in fiction
Cultural depictions of John Madden

it:Episodi de I Griffin (prima stagione)#Soldi dal cielo